Silcoates School is a co-educational independent school in the village of Wrenthorpe near Wakefield, England.

The school was founded in 1820 as the Northern Congregational School at Silcoates House, for the board and education of the sons of Nonconformist clergy, and was situated close to Ossett and Horbury, each of which had unusually large Nonconformist populations. It was a boys' boarding school until 1995, receiving pupils from around the world. Girls were admitted into the sixth form from 1976, with female boarders accommodated in the Coach House. The school now exists as a co-educational day school with a campus on the border between the villages of Wrenthorpe and Alverthorpe.

Silcoates School is made up of three separate, but closely linked, sections: a Senior School for boys and girls aged 11 to 18 (Year 7 to the Upper Sixth Form); a Junior School for boys and girls aged 4 to 11 (Year 1 to Year 6); and Pre-School for boys and girls aged 3 to 4.

Motto
The school's motto is "Clarior ex Ignibus" (brighter through the flames), commemorating a fire of 1904 which caused the school to move into temporary exile in Saltburn, on the coast of North Yorkshire between Whitby and Middlesbrough.

Houses

There are four houses representing significant headmasters:
 Evans' (Yellow and green tie)
 Spencer's (Blue and green tie)
 Moore's (Light green and green tie)
 Yonge's (Red and green tie)

Curriculum
The majority of pupils usually take a minimum of 9 GCSEs, and 4 AS and 3 A2-Levels in the Sixth Form, with many progressing on to degree level courses. There is a wide and varied selection of subjects to choose from at GCSE and A Level, including some specialist and vocational programmes.

Sport and activities
School activities include drama and art, and music with a music school. Sport facilities include an indoor pool and sports pitches. The Duke of Edinburgh’s Award programme makes use of various venues in the north of England and abroad.

Entrance scholarships
Academic Scholarships are offered at 11+ and above; Sixth Form entrants are eligible for these awards.
Bursaries are available for the sons and daughters of ministers and missionaries of the United Reformed Church, the Congregational Church, of other recognised Christian denominations, and to some parents subject to a financial assessment.

Notable former staff and pupils

 Imran Ahmad Khan  (born 1973), Member of Parliament (MP) for Wakefield (December 2019-May 2022)
 Hugh Banton (1949), Progressive rock icon, member of Van der Graaf Generator
 Andrew Burt (1945–2018), Actor
 Reece Chapman-Smith (born 1998), rugby league player for Leeds Rhinos and Halifax RLFC
 George Entwistle (born 1962), Former Director General of the BBC
 J. S. Fletcher (1865–1935), historian, writer of historical and detective novels
 Josh Holling (born 1996), cricketer
 John Horam (born 1939), Conservative Party Member of Parliament (MP) for Orpington
 Karim Ahmad Khan (born 1970), Chief Prosecutor of the International Criminal Court
 Richard O'Dwyer (born 1988), Creator of TVShack.net
 Mark Harrison (born 1971), Caribbean Squash Champion
 Sir William Peel (1875–1945), colonial governor of Hong Kong
 Sir Henry Norman Rae (1860–1928) Liberal MP for Shipley
 James Guinness Rogers (1822–1911), Nonconformist divine
 Oliver Rowland (born 1992), British Racecar driver
 Thomas Scales was chaplain and secretary at the school in 1850.
 William Thomas Stead (1849–1912), journalist, campaigner, victim of RMS Titanic disaster
 David Stiff (born 1984), County Cricketer
 Tim Stimpson (born 1973), International rugby player
 Theodore Taylor (1850–1952), Businessman, Liberal politician, Profit-sharing pioneer
 Maurice Yonge (1899–1986), zoologist

See also
Listed buildings in Wrenthorpe and Outwood West

References

External links
 Silcoates School

Private schools in the City of Wakefield
Educational institutions established in 1820
Schools in Wakefield